Elizavetovca is a commune in Dondușeni District, Moldova. It is composed of two villages, Boroseni and Elizavetovca (formerly Elisabeta).

References

Communes of Dondușeni District